The Legare-Morgan House is a one-story clapboard structure built in Aiken, South Carolina around 1835. From 1850 to 1859 it was the home of the artist, poet and inventor, James Mathews Legare.  In 1870 the property was sold to Thomas C. Morgan. The home, located in proximity to Aiken's downtown area, was listed on the National Register of Historic Places September 22, 1977.

References

Houses on the National Register of Historic Places in South Carolina
Houses completed in 1850
Houses in Aiken County, South Carolina
National Register of Historic Places in Aiken County, South Carolina
Buildings and structures in Aiken, South Carolina